This is a list of United Nations resolutions in the General Assembly and in the Security Council in direct response to the COVID-19 pandemic, as part of the United Nations' response to the coronavirus pandemic.

General Assembly 
 2 April 2020: A/RES/74/270: Global solidarity to fight the coronavirus disease 2019 (COVID-19).
 20 April 2020: A/RES/74/274: International cooperation to ensure global access to medicines, vaccines and medical equipment to face COVID-19.

Security Council 
 1 July 2020: S/RES/2532: Maintenance of international peace and security.

See also 
 Global ceasefire
 Timeline of the COVID-19 pandemic
 World Health Organization's response to the COVID-19 pandemic

References 

International responses to the COVID-19 pandemic
United Nations-related lists
United Nations resolutions
United Nations resolutions